OTV (launched in 2007) is a publicly traded television station in Lebanon, connected to the Free Patriotic Movement political party (التيار اللوطني الحر). It is nicknamed 'Orange TV' due to its orange logo, which has been linked with the FPM, whose logo is also orange.

Launching 
OTV began broadcasting on 20 July 2007 on the Arabsat satellite, on the 11823 MHz frequency, but launched officially in 2008 after a testing period of almost six months. OTV now covers the world through different broadcasting channels for European Union, Canada, United States, Australia, and the Arab World.

In addition, www.otv.com.lb offers live-streaming coverage on the internet. The OTV main news bulletin is also broadcast on Sawt Al Mada Radio (92.5 & 92.7 MHz).

OTV targets all Lebanese in particular and Arabs in general. Creates an interactive link between the Lebanese residents in Lebanon and the Lebanese Diaspora throughout the world. OTV is one of the first TV stations in the region to adopt a strong social Media presence, its Facebook Page was founded on April 12, 2008. OTV also has a large following on YouTube and Twitter.

Live Streaming is available in the Mobile App on Both Android and iOS.

Corporate structure
Al Lubnaniah Lil I'Lam SAL is the Lebanese joint stock company, titular of the OTV television broadcasting license granted by the Lebanese Council of Ministers on 22 June 2006.  OTV (Holding) SAL is a recently incorporated investment company; its purpose is to set up, develop, promote, equip, manage, support and/or finance specialized affiliate entities operating in related fields while relying on a strategic alliance with OTV as its main media arm.

News Bulletins
In Arabic: 07:00 - 14:15 - 19:45 (main bulletin) - 23.30 
In Armenian: 16:30

Programs
Next (daily variety show)
بالمباشر (weekly political talk show)
Agenda اليوم (Daily early morning show)
Kazadoo (Kid's show)
يوم جديد (Daily morning show)
حوار أليوم (Daily political talk show)
ضروري نحكي We need to talk (Weekly social political show)
LOL (Entertainment show) 
Min La Min (Entertainment show)
الحق يقال-ماغي فرح (Political talk show)
Reflex (Social talk show)
OVRIRA (Comedy show)
Beirut عيش (Variety show)
Made in Paris (Variety show)
Khod Khbaron Men Neswenon (Entertainment show)
Khabar aw Khabrieh (News show)
فكّر مرّتين (Political /social talk show)
Wayn Saro (Documentaries)
Fi al Tafassil (Political/social talk Show)
No'ta Fassleh (Cultural/social talk Show)
Meen Lameen (Social/game Show)
Tleteen layle w layle (Ramadan Variety Show)
O Cinema (Cinema news)
O sport (Sport news)
Todd w Aya (Animated show for kids)
Fish khel2ak (Daily social show)
Puzzle (Game show)
Be Lebnan (Game show)
فكرة عالنار (Ramadan cooking show)
شو بتتوقع؟ (Predictions with Mike Feghaly)
مقلب مرتّب  (Ramadan comedy show)
عشرة بعد النشرة (Daily political/comedy show)
Les Aventures de Jad et Nour (Kids)
Very Very Chatoura (Ramadan cooking show)
Boukra Elna (Social/educational show)
الحياة أقوى (Ramadan social show)
Mina al Chaeeb (Reports)
الصليب الأحمر 140 (Reality/social show)
إيمانك خلصك (Social/religious show)
أنوار رمضان (Social/religious show)
La2La2a (Talk show)
Oof (Lebanese Zajal show)
جايين نجرّبكن (Cooking/ Reality show)
Abou el Abed & Co (Comedy show)
MicroScoop (Entertainment news show)
Laouna al Seha (Game show)
Face e Profile (Entertainment news show)
بين السطور (Political talk show)
عنار لطيفه (Daily Cooking show)
حديث أخر (Talk show)
Paris je T'M (Entertainment, lifestyle, Fashion show)
ليلة من العمر (Lifestyle, Fashion show)
Look Jdeed (Entertainment, lifestyle, Fashion show)
كلام هونيك ناس (Comedy talk show)
What's up (Lifestyle)
جيل الإنجيل (Social/religion), presented by Father Joseph Soueid

Satellite frequencies

 Arab World, Europe, Africa: OTV is Available on: Arabsat Badr 4 Frequency:11977 MHz Vertical, Symbol rate: 27500
 North America: USA: OTV is Available on Dish Network:To Subscribe call 1-888-458-1278, Canada: OTV is Available on Mysatgo
 Australia: OTV is Available on:Intelsat 8 12646 MHz vertical Orbital Position: 166 East Transporter: 22 Frequency: 12646 MHz Polarisation: Vertical To subscribe visit www.mysat.tv or call 1800 700 506.
 France: OTV is available on Free, Orange, Bouygues Télécom, Virgin and SFR. The channel is still included in the "Bouquet Libanais" www.bouquet-liban.tv
 UK: OTV is available on Roku, Samsung Smart TV, Now TV Box and Online TV portal. The channel is included in Arabia One
 Sweden:OTV is available as part of Arabic bouquet on Zone TV
 Lebanon:OTV terrestrial digital transmission is available through: Cablevision, Econet, and CityTV

See also

 Television in Lebanon
MTV
LBC
NBN
Future TV

References

External links

2007 establishments in Lebanon
Television channels and stations established in 2007
Arabic-language television stations
Television stations in Lebanon
Arab mass media